The Thought Remains The Same is a 2000 compilation album consisting of songs by bands on Nitro Records. The album was originally titled Deep Thoughts. Its title is a parody of the Led Zeppelin song "The Song Remains the Same".

Track listing
 "Cafe 405" – The Vandals – 2:11
 "A Single Second" – AFI – 2:12
 "1, 2, 3... Slam" – Guttermouth – 1:45
 "Superficial Love" – T.S.O.L. – 1:19
 "Victims & Volunteers" – Jughead's Revenge – 3:11
 "Floorlord" – One Hit Wonder – 2:43
 "The Thing from Uranus" – Sloppy Seconds – 3:41
 "D.U.I." – The Offspring – 2:26
 "Self Pity" – AFI – 0:57
 "Chicken Box" (Live) – Guttermouth – 1:30
 "And Now We Dance" – The Vandals – 2:04
 "Power Trip" – One Hit Wonder – 2:36
 "Pain" – Jughead's Revenge – 2:22
 "This Won't Hurt a Bit" – Guttermouth – 1:54
 "If the Gov't Could Read My Mind" – The Vandals – 2:21
 "Let's Kill the Trendy" – Sloppy Seconds – 2:21
 "You Don't Have to Die" – T.S.O.L. – 3:23
 "Love Is a Many Splendored Thing" – AFI – 1:31
 "Lipstick" – Guttermouth – 2:53
 "Tehran" – The Offspring – 3:07
 "But Then She Spoke" – The Vandals – 1:56
 "Perfect Fit" – AFI – 1:59

Track origins
"Cafe 405" and "If The Gov't Could Read My Mind" from Hitler Bad, Vandals Good
"A Single Second" from Shut Your Mouth and Open Your Eyes
"1, 2, 3... Slam" from Full Length LP
"Superficial Love" from Weathered Statues
"Victims & Volunteers" from Just Joined
"Floorlord" and "Powertrip" from Outfall
"The Thing From Uranus" and "Let's Kill The Trendy" from More Trouble Than They're Worth
"DUI" from Club Me
"Self Pity" from Answer That and Stay Fashionable
"Chicken Box" and "This Won't Hurt A Bit" from Live from the Pharmacy
"And Now We Dance" from Live Fast, Diarrhea
"Pain" from Image Is Everything
"Love Is a Many Splendored Thing" from vinyl version of Very Proud of Ya
"Lipstick" from Musical Monkey
"Tehran" from The Offspring
"But Then She Spoke" from The Quickening
"Perfect Fit" from Very Proud of Ya

References

External links
The Thought Remains the Same on Nitro Records

2000 compilation albums
Punk rock compilation albums
Nitro Records compilation albums